Vladimir Ochkan (born 13 January 1968) is a Ukrainian male former track and field athlete who competed in the long jump. He won the gold medal at the 1987 European Athletics Junior Championships with a championship record mark of  – a record which still stands as of 2018. He set a lifetime best of  outdoors that year, ranking eighth on the global lists.

Ochkan represented the Soviet Union twice at global level, reaching the finals at the 1991 World Championships in Athletics and the 1991 IAAF World Indoor Championships. He won one national title in his career, at the Ukrainian Indoor Championships in 1996.

International competitions

National titles
Ukrainian Indoor Championships
Long jump: 1996

References

External links

Living people
1968 births
Ukrainian male long jumpers
Soviet male long jumpers
World Athletics Championships athletes for the Soviet Union